Tiruchirappalli–Thiruvananthapuram Central Intercity Express is an Express train connecting Tiruchirappalli with Thiruvananthapuram, capital of Kerala, via Dindigul, Madurai, Tirunelveli, Nagercoil between the states of Tamil Nadu and Kerala, India.

General information
This train was introduced during the 2012–2013 railway budget as a new daily train between Tiruchirappalli and Tirunelveli in Tamil Nadu, India. The train, numbered as 22627/22628, made its inaugural run on 14 July 2012. And it made its regular service since 15 July 2012. This train has extended up to Thiruvananthapuram Central since 15 July 2017.

Rakes
The train has 18 bogies comprising One A/C Chair Car (CC), Seven Second Seating (2S), 8 Unreserved Coaches (UR/GS), 2 Luggage Rake (SLR), eight general compartments (unreserved).

Enroute

See also 
 Rockfort Express
 Cholan Express
 Pallavan Express
 Vaigai Express
 Pandian Express
 Guruvayur Express
 Ananthapuri Express

Notes

References

External links
 Southern Railway – Official Website

Rail transport in Tamil Nadu
Railway services introduced in 2012
Transport in Thiruvananthapuram
Rail transport in Tiruchirappalli
Intercity Express (Indian Railways) trains
Rail transport in Kerala